"From Here to Eternity" is a song by English heavy metal band Iron Maiden, released as the second single from their album Fear of the Dark, released in 1992.

Synopsis
The song is the fourth and most recent song in the ongoing saga of "Charlotte the Harlot" (other songs include "Charlotte the Harlot," "22 Acacia Avenue," "Hooks in You”). The song tells the tale of Charlotte going on a fateful motorcycle ride with the Devil.
 
This is the first studio single to not feature Eddie in the artwork - second overall, after the live version of "Running Free" - using a picture of the song's music video instead, and it is one of two single from Fear of the Dark to not feature the mascot, the other being "Wasting Love". 
The cover of the 7" Etched Disc is the cover most people associate with the single, though the 12" was a very different picture from the clip. The CD Maxi used the 7" etched cover, but a different shot again from the clip is on the Netherlands release of the CD.

The single was released in several formats: 7" etched disc with the tracks on one side and an image etched into the other; 7" cut to shape picture disc; 12" with fold-out sleeve; and a cd-single.

It charted and peaked at #21 on the UK Singles Chart.

B-sides
"Roll Over Vic Vella" is a cover of Chuck Berry's "Roll Over Beethoven" featuring spoken intro and outro pieces by longtime Iron Maiden roadie and friend Vic Vella talking with Steve Harris. The song appeared on all formats except the 7" shaped picture disc which featured "I Can't See My Feelings", a cover of the Welsh band Budgie from their 1975 album Bandolier. The song didn't appear on any digital format until 1995 when Fear of the Dark was reissued with a bonus CD containing b-sides from the album's singles. The live versions of "Public Enema No One" and "No Prayer for the Dying" on these singles are the only time either has appeared live on any Iron Maiden release.

Track listing 
7" Etched Single

7" Pictured Single

12" Single

CD-Maxi Single

Personnel
Bruce Dickinson – vocals
Dave Murray – guitar
Janick Gers – guitar, backing vocals
Steve Harris – bass guitar, backing vocals
Nicko McBrain – drums

Chart performance

References

Iron Maiden songs
1992 singles
Songs written by Steve Harris (musician)
1992 songs
EMI Records singles